The Cloaca Maxima is one of the world's earliest sewage systems.

Cloaca Maxima may also refer to:

 Cloaca Maxima (album), a 1997 compilation album
 Cloaca Maxima (band), a Finnish rock band